New York's 22nd State Assembly district is one of the 150 districts in the New York State Assembly. It has been represented by Michaelle Solages since 2013, succeeding Grace Meng.

Geography
District 22 is in Nassau County. It contains Valley Stream, North Valley Stream, Elmont, South Valley Stream, South Floral Park, Floral Park, Bellerose, Bellerose Terrace, North Woodmere, Stewart Manor, and sections of Franklin Square.

Recent election results

2022

2020

2018

2016

2014

2012

References

22
Nassau County, New York